Thathi is a town in Gujar Khan Tehsil, Punjab, Pakistan.  Thathi is a village in the eastern part of Gujarkhan, and also south east of Rawalpindi.

Union council Thathi is the most the wealthy council in Gujarkhan with its large population being settled in the UK.

According to the 1998 Census of Pakistan, it had a population of 14,563 (estimated over 30,000 in 2011).

References

Populated places in Gujar Khan Tehsil
Union councils of Gujar Khan Tehsil